Lent is a commune in the Ain department in eastern France.

Geography
The Veyle flows north through the middle of the commune.

Population

See also
 Dombes
Communes of the Ain department

References

Communes of Ain
Dombes
Ain communes articles needing translation from French Wikipedia